The Caucasian birch mouse (Sicista caucasica) is a species of rodent in the family Sminthidae, that is endemic to Russia. Reports that it occurs in Turkey probably refer to Armenian birch mouse (Sicista armenica), from which it can only be reliably distinguished on the basis of karyotype. The Caucasian birch mouse inhabits the Western Montane Caucasus area, land situated between the Black sea and the Caspian sea.

References

External links

Sicista
Mammals of Russia
Endemic fauna of Russia
Taxonomy articles created by Polbot
Mammals described in 1925